The Holland Wooden Shoes were a minor league baseball team based in Holland, Michigan. In 1910 and 1911, the Wooden Shoes played as members of the Class D level Western Michigan League and its successor, the 1911 Michigan State League. The Wooden Shoes hosted home games at the 19th Street Grounds.

History
Minor league baseball began in Holland, Michigan in 1910. The Holland "Wooden Shoes" became charter members of the reformed four–team Class D level Western Michigan League. Holland joined the Cadillac Chiefs, Muskegon Speed Boys and Traverse City Resorters in beginning league play on May 28, 1910.

The Holland, Michigan use of the "Wooden Shoes" moniker corresponds to namesake Holland culture. In the country of the Netherlands (often incorrectly referred to as Holland), wooden shoes or clogs are prevalent in history and culture.

In their first season of play, the 1910 Holland Wooden Shoes finished last in the Western Michigan League final standings. Beginning play on May 28, 1910, the Wooden Shoes ended the 1940 regular season with a record of 40–56, playing under managers Charles Doyle, Emerson Dickerson and Clyde McNutt. Holland finished in fourth place as Cadillac won the championship with a 53–42 record, finishing 13.5 games ahead of the Wooden Shoes. In the final standings, Cadillac was followed by second place Traverse City Resorters (50–45), third place Muskegon (48–48) and fourth place Holland (40–56).

The Holland Wooden Shoes played their final season in 1911. Holland joined a new league, as the Western Michigan League expanded and became the reformed six–team Class D level Michigan State League. The Manistee Colts and Boyne City Boosters franchises joined the four returning 1910 Western Michigan League teams in beginning league play on May 23, 1911. Holland ended the 1911 season with a record of 48–71 and placed fifth in the final standings. Managed by Clyde McNutt, Ted Penfold, Ed McDonough and W. Schaefer, the Chiefs finished 26.0 games behind the first place Manistee Colts.

The Holland franchise was replaced by the Ludington Mariners in the 1912 Michigan State League. Holland, Michigan has not hosted another minor league team.

Today, the Holland baseball Little League hosts an annual "Wooden Shoe Tournament."

The ballpark
The Holland Wooden Shoes hosted minor league home games at 19th Street Grounds. The ballpark was also known as Athletic Park. Today, the park is known as Rosa Parks Green. The location is 84 East 19th Street, Holland, Michigan.

Timeline

Year–by–year records

Notable alumni

Ed Hendricks (1910)
Bill Lauterborn (1911)
Doc Lavan (1910)

See also
Holland Wooden Shoes players

References

External links
Holland - Baseball Reference

Defunct minor league baseball teams
Defunct baseball teams in Michigan
Baseball teams established in 1910
Baseball teams disestablished in 1911
Michigan State League teams
Holland, Michigan